Léon Deubel (22 March 1879 – 12 June 1913) was a French poet.

Biography 
Poor, misfit, he killed himself by plunging into the Marne after he burned his manuscripts. Deubel is considered to have been the last poète maudit. He was associated with the syndicalist Pierre Monatte.

Bibliography 
Maurice Favone, Le Poète Léon Deubel, Paris, R. Debresse, Bibliothèque de l’artistocratie, 1939, 63 pages.

References

External links 
Le poème Détresse de Léon Deubel on Florilege.free.fr
Épitaphe on Florilege.free.fr
Le poème tombeau du poète on Biblisem

1879 births
1913 deaths
French poets
1913 suicides
Suicides by drowning in France